The Chocón Machacas Protected Biotope is a protected nature reserve in eastern Guatemala. It is located in the municipality of Livingston, in a densely forested area covering the lower reaches of the Chocón Machacas River basin and the northern shores of the Río Dulce-Golfete Dulce system.

The Chocón Machacas river and Golfete Dulce complex form one of Guatemala's few remaining habitats for the endangered Caribbean manatee (Trichechus manatus).

References

Protected areas of Guatemala
Protected areas established in 1989
Central American Atlantic moist forests